Department of Social Welfare may refer to:
 Department of Social Protection in Ireland, named "Department of Social Welfare" 1947–1997
 Ministry of Social Development (New Zealand), named "Department of Social Welfare" 1972–1998
 Social Welfare Department, Hong Kong
 Department of Social Welfare and Development, Philippines

See also
 Ministry of Social Welfare (disambiguation)
 :Category:Social affairs ministries